Andrea Ceccato (born 26 January 1985) is an Italian rugby union player. His usual position is as a Prop and he currently plays for Mogliano in Top12. 

In 2006 Ceccato was named in the Italy Under 21 and in 2009 he was also named in the Italy A squad for 2009 IRB Nations Cup.

References 

It's Rugby England Profile
Ultimate Rugby Profile
ESPN Profile

1985 births
Living people
Italian rugby union players
Rugby union props
Mogliano Rugby players